George Cyrus Thorpe (January 7, 1875 – July 28, 1936) was a United States Marine Corps officer during the Spanish–American War and the Philippine–American War. He was an early writer on military logistics. He was one of 23 Marine Corps officers awarded the Marine Corps Brevet Medal for bravery. He was also an author and lawyer after he retired from the Marine Corps.

Biography

Thorpe was born January 7, 1875, in Northfield, Minnesota, and in 1894 received an appointment to the United States Naval Academy in Annapolis, Maryland.

He resigned in November 1896 but when the Spanish–American War started he applied for a commission in the Marine Corps and was appointed a Second Lieutenant.

In 1903–1904, Captain Thorpe commanded the Marine guard of the American diplomatic mission to Abyssinia, and photographed the emperor Menelik II.

He married Cora Wells of Minnesota, and the marriage produced daughter Amy Elizabeth Thorpe, who became an American spy, codenamed "Cynthia", who worked for William Stephenson during World War II, director of British Security Coordination, a cover organization in New York City set up by British Secret Intelligence Service (MI6) in 1940.

While serving in the Marine Corps he earned his Bachelor of Science from New York University in 1910. In 1912 he served in Cuba during U.S. intervention in the Negro Rebellion. Thorpe also graduated from the Naval War College in 1915 before serving on its staff, earned a Master of Arts from Brown University in 1916, and completed the General Staff College in 1921.

He was a Major when he was assigned to the Marine Barracks, Washington, D.C., in 1917.

In 1922 or 1923 he was found not physically qualified for further service because several toes from both feet had been amputated.  He was placed on the retired list as a colonel.

After retiring from the Marine Corps he became a lawyer and author, writing several books on legal subjects.  He had previously written on military matters.

George Thorpe died July 28, 1936, at Bethesda Naval Hospital in Bethesda, Maryland, and is buried at Arlington National Cemetery. He married Cora Edna Wells, on April 8, 1908, the daughter of a Minnesota senator. They had had three children; the eldest, Amy Elizabeth Thorpe, was a successful World War II spy.

Presidential citation
Citation
 The President of the United States takes pleasure in presenting the Marine Corps Brevet Medal to George Cyrus Thorpe, First Lieutenant, U.S. Marine Corps, for distinguished conduct and public service in the presence of the enemy at Novaleta, Philippine Islands. On 28 March 1901, appointed Captain, by brevet, from 8 October 1899.

Secretary of the Navy citation
Citation
 The Secretary of the Navy takes pleasure in transmitting to First Lieutenant George Cyrus Thorpe, United States Marine Corps, the Brevet Medal which is awarded in accordance with Marine Corps Order No. 26 (1921), for distinguished conduct and public service in the presence of the enemy while serving with the Second Battalion of Marines, at Novaleta, Philippine Islands, on 8 October 1899. On 28 March 1901, First Lieutenant Thorpe is appointed Captain, by brevet, to rank from 8 October 1899.

Works
 Military
 Thorpe, George C. Pure Logistics: The Science of War Preparation (Kansas City, MO: Franklin Hudson Pub. Co., 1917) (multiple formats at Google; US access only, page images at HathiTrust) At the Federal Depository Library Program Electronic Collection Archive of the US Government Publishing Office.
  (page images at HathiTrust)
 Law
 Thorpe, George C. Federal Departmental Organization and Practice (Kansas City, Vernon law book co.; St. Paul, West publishing co., 1925) (page images at HathiTrust)
 Thorpe, George Cyrus. National and State Prohibition under Eighteenth Amendment: Including Industrial Liquor Regulations, Digest of Cases, Forms and Words and Phrases, Peculiar to the Liquor Industry, Judicially Defined (1926)
 Thorpe, George Cyrus. Prohibition Digest: Statutory References and Digest of Decisions of the Courts of the United States Relating to Intoxicating Liquor (1926)
  (page images at HathiTrust)
 Thorpe, George C. "Contracts payable in gold", showing the legal effect of agreements to pay in gold (Document / 73d Congress, 1st session, Senate). (1933)

References

General
 
 
 
 

Specific

External links
 
 8th&I
 A Brief History of the 3d Marines 

1875 births
1936 deaths
United States Marine Corps officers
People from Northfield, Minnesota
United States Naval Academy alumni 
Burials at Arlington National Cemetery
American military personnel of the Spanish–American War 
American male writers
New York University alumni
Brown University alumni
American military personnel of the Philippine–American War
Naval War College alumni
Naval War College faculty
United States Army Command and General Staff College alumni
Military personnel from Minnesota
Recipients of orders, decorations, and medals of Ethiopia